Brad McGann MNZM (22 February 1964 – 2 May 2007), was a New Zealand film director and screenwriter.

McGann was born in Auckland, New Zealand in 1964. He completed a Bachelor of Commerce degree at the University of Otago and in 1988 completed a one-year post-graduate course at the Swinburne School of Film and Television (now a part of the Victorian College of the Arts) in Melbourne. He directed the drama It Never Rains in 1996 as well as co-directing the documentary  Come As You Are for the Australian Broadcasting Corporation (ABC), and the award-winning short film Possum.

In 2004 and 2005 McGann won international acclaim for his first full-length feature film, In My Father's Den, which was based on Maurice Gee's novel.  McGann  wrote the screenplay and directed the film.

The film won the Fipresci Prize at the 2004 Toronto International Film Festival and the Mercedes Benz Youth Jury Prize at the  52nd San Sebastian Film Festival in Spain in the same year, and the Special Jury Prize at the Seattle International Film Festival in 2005. It became one of the top 10 grossing New Zealand films.

McGann was made a Member of the New Zealand Order of Merit in the 2006 New Years Honours List. He died on 2 May 2007 after a long battle with bowel cancer, having first been diagnosed in 1998.

References

External links

 News releases on McGann and My Father’s Den

1964 births
2007 deaths
Deaths from colorectal cancer
New Zealand film directors
New Zealand screenwriters
Male screenwriters
Members of the New Zealand Order of Merit
University of Otago alumni
Deaths from cancer in New Zealand
20th-century screenwriters